Tyalgum is a rural village located in north-eastern New South Wales, Australia.

Tyalgum is situated at the junction of Pumpenbil and Tyalgum Creeks. These creeks provide Tyalgum with its water supply and when the village was first settled, the settlers would have used the waterways to transport the giant red cedar logs that they felled. Another major natural feature is the valley environment around the village created by the Border Ranges and Mount Warning.

Important structures in Tyalgum include:

 Flutterbies Cafe 
 The Little Shop Next Door
 Tyalgum Store (see photo), established in 1907
 Tyalgum Hall, home of the annual Classical Musical Festival
 Tyalgum Garage, located in the old Norco Dairy Manufactory Building

, Tyalgum plans to disconnect from the electricity grid, and produce renewable power locally, primarily using solar power and battery storage.

Tyalgum is temperate. It has a mean annual temperature of 18.9 °C (66 °F). The rainfall is generally high with an annual mean of 1,555.4 millimetres (61.2 in) most of which occurs during the summer months. For the last few years the region has been suffering from drought.

Demographics

The median age of the Tyalgum population was 39 years, 2 years above the national median of 37.

86.7% of people living in Tyalgum were born in Australia. The other top responses for country of birth were England 4.4%, New Zealand 1.4%, South Africa 0.8%, Germany 0.6%, Austria 0.6%.

95.4% of people spoke only English at home; the next most common languages were 0.6% Punjabi, 0.6% German, 0.6% Mandarin, 0.6% Thai.

Classical Music Festival

The Tyalgum Festival of Classical Music started in 1991 after concert violinists Carmel Kaine and John Willison discovered the idyllic acoustics of the village Hall. Since this date, the festival has been held annually in September as one of Australia's premier classical events. Numerous artists have ranked the 1908 hall alongside some of the best concert venues in the world.

The  Birth of the Tyalgum Festival of Classical Music - 1991

The Tyalgum Festival of Classical Music also known as the Tyalgum Festival was borne out of the combination of two events.

In 1990 Carmel Kaine, an original member and concertmaster of the Academy of St Martin in the Fields and John Willison former Principal Second Violin of the London Philharmonic Orchestra purchased their country retreat at Limpinwood not far from Tyalgum in the Tweed Valley.   They had recently taken up teaching positions at the Queensland Conservatory of Music.  
Shortly after their arrival at Limpinwood they were invited to dinner at the home of their neighbour, social worker Jean Brewer. As a result of discussions over dinner Carmel and John decided to hold a concert in their home and invite interested locals from Murwillumbah and the local Tyalgum district.   The object was to see if there were enough people interested in attending continuing musical soirées in their home.  
The concert took place in early 1991 in the lounge room of John and Carmel's home.  A group of principal teachers from the Queensland Conservatory of music performed Schubert's Octet.   At the end of the concert a meeting was convened with a number of those attending  including Margot and Doug Anthony, Jean Brewer, Peter and Judy Budd, Viv and Neville Hibbard and Murwillumbah lawyer Greg Rooney.  They all agreed that a further concert should be held.  However it was suggested that it be held in the historic Tyalgum Literary Institute Hall.The Tyalgum Literary Institute Hall 1907
In 1986 local Tyalgum theatrical artists, William Gill and Les Peterkin, formed the Tyalgum Theatre group and produced a number of theatrical spectaculars. They were "Vive La Tyalgum", "Alice In Bananaland", "Red, Hot and Blue", "A Funny Thing Happened on the Way to Tyalgum", "All Aboard the SS Tyalgum","The 1988 B-Centennial Show","Mucho Muchacha"and "South Pathetic" at The Tyalgum Literary Institute Hall. Video clips from some of these shows can be seen at TYALGUM THEATRE GROUP on YouTube.The Tyalgum Theatre group raised over $16.000 for local charities during that time. A new curtain, stage lighting and a sound system was also installed by the TTG.  However, there was a constant problem with the uninsulated corrugated iron roof which made audiences freeze in the winter and boil in the summer.  Whenever it rained performances had to stop because of a loud noise.  It was suggested that a remedy might be to insulate the ceiling. The shows were presented in the form of Dinner Shows and the hall was set up with tables. Meals were provided by the Local Hall Committee. The Theatre Group also performed at the Tyalgum Hotel. Shows were cast from interested and enthusiastic locals from Tyalgum and Murwillumbah.
At the time Greg Rooney was involved in promoting the proposed Murwillumbah Amphitheatre on Hospital Hill in Murwillumbah as a bicentennial project.  Peter Knowland, one of Australia's leading acoustic engineers, visited Murwillumbah as part of the feasibility study.  He was asked to also visit the Murwillumbah Civic Centre (which was having acoustic problems) and The Tyalgum Literary Institute Hall.    His strong advice with respect to the Tyalgum Hall was to not insulate the internal roof structure as in his opinion the Hall had an excellent acoustic.  In his view this resulted from a combination of the ripple corrugated iron ceiling that dispersed the echo, the wooden floors and the particular dimensions of the hall that gave it such a warm and clear sound.  He provided a written report on the hall.  He suggested that any remedial work to solve the noise and insulation problems with the roof should be constructed on top of the current roof which should remain as the internal surface.
Another influence on the birth of the Tyalgum Festival was a concert arranged in the late 1980s by Musica Viva.  The performance was by the Australia Ensemble led by Dean Olding at the Anglican Church in Murwillumbah.  There were six people in the audience. There were more performers on stage than in the audience.  It became clear of the importance of having an inspiring venue that would complement excellent performances and as such attract audiences.  It was felt that Musica Viva might agree to continue subsidising performances in the Tweed Valley if s a better venue could be found.

The Limpinwood Ensemble and the  Tyalgum Literary Institute Hall 
It was agreed, based on the acoustic report of Peter Knowland  that Carmel and John and their associates at the Queensland Conservatory of music would  perform a one-off concert at the Tyalgum Hall in the later part of 1991.   A local committee was formed to organise a concert with John Willison in association with Carmel Kaine to organise the program.  It was decided that John and Carmel's ensemble needed a formal name for  publicity purposes.  The Limpinwood Ensemble was thus born. 
The first concert was held in the latter half of 1991.  The ticket price included a full supper provided by Jean Brewer and Sue Pepper.  The concert was a sell-out and a great success. The provision of an on-site meal was a feature of this concert and was continued, with the assistance of Tyalgum Chef Gary Jackson, for subsequent concerts as a way of developing the social enhancement of the Tyalgum experience. The upstairs "Jade Room " at the back of the hall became the venue for Festival meals. 
The core founding committee of the Tyalgum Festival consisted of President  Greg Rooney (1991 to 1996), Vice President Viv Hibbard, Secretary  Jean Brewer and  Neville Hibbard. There were a number of concerts during the early part of 1992 with the first Tyalgum Festival held over the first weekend of September 1992.
The first festival included the provision of home hosting, natural history walks, the Sunday church service, Sunday concert in the Showgrounds Park and a number of fringe events.  The committee recognised the value of marketing and so developed a database of supporters by instigating a ‘Friends of the Tyalgum Festival’ programme. 
The Tyalgum Festival was established without any government funding so the financial risk fell to the local committee. However each concert during the early part of 1992 and subsequent early years made a profit sufficient to fund the weekend Festival in September.  Because of its success in attracting good audiences the committee was able to pay the performers at rates higher than were being paid in Brisbane at that time.  
Other innovations included commencing a programme of commissioning works by leading composers based on the theme of Tyalgum.  The first of these involved the committee applying for and been awarded a grant for composer Robert Davidson to produce a work titled "Tyalgum" which was performed by Patricia Pollet and Perihelion at the following year's festival
The key to the great success of the Tyalgum Festival was that the inaugural committee focused on the logistics while John Willison focused on the program and organising the performers.  It was only later that Musica Viva provided assistance with performances (particularly the Australian String Quartet) together with some grants from the New South Wales Minister for the Arts. The committee eventually obtained a Commonwealth grant of $10,000 (the highest non capital-city grant under the Keating arts grants of 1995).  The money was used to seed fund the next Festival and to bring Roger Woodward to Tyalgum.
The original committee remained up until 1996.  Subsequent committees have continued to expand and successfully develop the Tyalgum festival up to the present day.

The Bakehouse Pottery and Galleria Artisans.
Potter, Les Peterkin purchased the village bakery in 1981 and converted it to the Bakehouse Pottery. It became a popular feature and tourist attraction in the village. Les Peterkin pottery became well known and is now very collectable. His website, www.lespeterkinpottery.com features over 400 of his works.
The Bakehouse Pottery is now known as Flutterbys Cafe.
Les Peterkin was also a part-time teacher at the Tyalgum Primary School, and the "Les Peterkin Portrait Prize" for children was begun 1n 1994. It is now a very successful event on the art calendar every year, about 30 schools participate, attracting about 3000 entries. It is shown in the Tweed River Gallery, Murwillumbah usually in October.

References 

Suburbs of Tweed Heads, New South Wales